A tattoo cover-up is the act of tattooing over a previously unwanted tattoo with a new tattoo. It is usually seen as being one of two options of removing an unwanted tattoo; the other option being laser removal. Covering up an unwanted tattoo is generally cheaper than tattoo removal. Numerous celebrities have employed tattoo artists to cover up existing tattoos, often after the breakup of a relationship. Examples include Denise Richards, Pete Davidson and Angelina Jolie.

Methods

Poorly applied, faded, or light tattoos are the easiest to cover and can only be covered up using the same or darker ink. White ink may be applied to lighten the old tattoo before proceeding with the cover-up.

Cover-ups can completely hide the old tattoo with a new design, or the cover-up can incorporate elements or the whole of the existing tattoo.

The new ink being deposited over the old ink is combined together to create a new color, which is why it is easier to use black ink for most cover-ups. The focus is on the color of the existing tattoo and how to incorporate the new color and best conceal the tattoo. Cover-up designs will always be bigger in size compared to the previous design, as it helps to hide the design. Typically some of the previous tattoo is still visible.

A person may choose a "blackout" tattoo design as part of covering an old tattoo.

The cover-up process is time-consuming and requires effort. Some tattoo artists refuse to do a cover-up as they want do not want to tattoo their art on previously inked skin. 

Methods for quick and effective cover-ups include keeping the cover-up design close to the old design, fading a tattoo by removing excess ink, and strengthening weak lines.

References 

Tattooing
Tattooing by body part